This is a list of acts of the Parliament of South Africa enacted in the years 2000 to 2009.

South African acts are uniquely identified by the year of passage and an act number within that year. Some acts have gone by more than one short title in the course of their existence; in such cases each title is listed with the years in which it applied.

2000

2001

2002

2003

2004

2005

2006

2007

2008

2009

References
 Government Gazette of the Republic of South Africa, Volumes 416–535.
 

2000